This is a list of wars involving the State of Eritrea.

Colonial period
Mahdist War (1881–1899), spilled into Eritrea in 1893–94
Italo-Ethiopian War (1887–1889)
Italo-Ethiopian War (1895–96)
Italo-Turkish War (1911–12)
Italo-Ethiopian War (1935–36)
World War II
East African campaign (1940–41)

Since 1950

See also
Second Afar insurgency
2013 Eritrean Army mutiny

References

External links
Country profile: Eritrea BBC 4 November 2005
Ethiopia Eritrea Independence War 1961–1993
Eritrean War for Independence
Comparative Study Between Yemeni-Eritrean Ways of Documentation in Arbitration Over Red Sea South Islands 52 - Yemen Times December 27 through January 2, 2000, Vol IX
Connell, Dan Eritrea-Ethiopia War Looms, Foreign Policy in Focus 21 January 2004
Gilkes, Patrick and Plaut, Martin. The War Between Ethiopia and Eritrea, Foreign Policy in Focus Volume 5, Number 25 August 2000

 
Eritrea
Wars